Kazaly (Qazaly), also known as Kazalinsk is a town in Kazaly District of Kyzylorda Region in Kazakhstan, located on the right bank of the Syr Darya River. Population:

History
During the Russian conquest of Central Asia, Kazalinsk was founded in 1853 as a fort and granted town status in 1867.

Climate

Notable people
 Agimsaly Duzelkhanov (1951-) – artist
 Roza Baglanova (1922–2011) – Soprano opera and pop vocalist

References

Populated places in Kyzylorda Region
Syr-Darya Oblast
Populated places established in 1853